Chingford United Reformed Church is a Grade II listed United Reformed Church at Buxton Road, Chingford, in the London Borough of Waltham Forest.

History
The original Congregational church in Chingford was founded in 1888, initially meeting at a café in Station Road called the Victoria Coffee Palace. A plot of land was bought by the church in 1889 and a temporary corrugated iron building, or "tin tabernacle" was erected on the site. In 1890, a church hall was opened, named Spicer Hall after James Spicer, a benefactor. The architect of the hall was Rowland Plumbe; it was eventually sold by the church and converted into apartments in 2004. In 1910, the new church was constructed; the architects were John Diggle Mould and his younger brother Samuel Joseph Mould, who were Primitive Methodists from Manchester that specialised in Nonconformist church buildings.

Description
Of red brick with stone banding, the west frontage facing Buxton Road has a triple entrance under a large Perpendicular Gothic window, leaded in the Art Nouveau style. A tower with pinnacles and a copper clad spire stands on the right of the front. Internally, a foyer below a gallery gives entry to a square nave, made octagonal by stone arches in the corners. A stone screen under a large arch divide the nave from a polygonal sanctuary.

References

Churches in the London Borough of Waltham Forest
Grade II listed buildings in the London Borough of Waltham Forest
United Reformed churches in London